Huamashraju, Wamashraju (possibly from Quechua rahu snow, ice, mountain with snow), Yanahuacra (possibly from Quechua yana black, waqra horn, "black horn") or Rajo Colta is a mountain in the Cordillera Blanca in the Andes of Peru, about  high. It is situated in the Ancash Region, Huaraz Province, Huaraz District. Huamashraju lies east of the town of Huaraz, west of Huantsán and northwest of Shacsha and Cashan.

Gallery

See also 
 Churup
 Rima Rima

References

Mountains of Peru
Mountains of Ancash Region